Roy Lockwood, (8 June 1907 to 25 April 2002) was a pioneering British film, television and radio director. His work included directing the radio soap opera Valiant Lady.

Radio
In 1941, Lockwood left the British Press Service and joined the production staff of NBC in New York City. He joined the staff of the Blue Network as a producer in 1942.

Later, he was head of BBC "productions from America to Britain," which he left to become producer of Light of the World for General Mills on CBS in 1945. While with the BBC, his work included producing The War in the Pacific and a series of broadcasts about United States military forces from their beginnings to what was then the present time.

Television
Lockwood was a producer for CBS-TV. His work there included producing Resources for Freedom in 1954.

Film
In 1955, Lockwood became a producer-director for Robert Lawrence Productions in New York.

Filmography
1930 Counterpoint
 The Laughter of Fools (1933)
1934 Airport
1937 The Mutiny of the Elsinore
 You're the Doctor (1938)
1940 The Invisible Man Returns
1957 Jamboree

References

External links

British film directors
1907 births
2002 deaths